Fledborough railway station is a former railway station south west of Fledborough, Nottinghamshire, England.

Context
Fledborough Railway Station contained 2 platforms, with platform 1 carrying the main building and platform 2 a shelter. Platform 2 also contained a stairway to a pathway which leads to the main road. Changing between the 2 platforms would have been done through the use of a wooden pedestrian crossing situated on the Dukeries Junction side of the station.
The station was opened by the LD&ECR in 1896 and closed by British Railways in 1955. The station and the stationmaster's house were built in the company's standard style.

From Tuxford the line fell gently past Marnham, where High Marnham Power Station was built in 1960. The junction to the power station was about 500 yards west of Fledborough Station, which was, in turn, just before the line crossed the River Trent by means of the Fledborough Viaduct.

Former services
There never was a Sunday service at Fledborough.

All these trains called at Fledborough.

From 1951 trains stopped running through to Chesterfield, turning back at Shirebrook North instead. Otherwise the same pattern continued until the last train on 17 September 1955.

Trains continued to pass, including Summer excursions which continued until 1964, but the picture was of progressive decline. A derailment east of Fledborough Viaduct on 21 February 1980 led to the immediate closure of the line from High Marnham Power Station through Fledborough to Pyewipe Junction. These tracks were subsequently lifted.

Modern times
Today the trackbed towards Ollerton is a test track. While eastwards from the site of Fledborough Station to near Pyewipe Junction the trackbed forms an off-road part of National Cycle Route 64.

What remains of the station today is merely the platforms, these being increasingly overgrown as time passes on. A recreation of the original "Fledborough" station sign sits on the westbound platform, with some of what remains of the original fencing strewn along both platforms. The original steps to the stationmasters house have been completely covered by foliage.

References

Sources

Further reading

External links
Fledborough Station on a navigable 1947 OS map npe Maps
Fledborough and High Marham Power Station Signalboxes

Disused railway stations in Nottinghamshire
Former Lancashire, Derbyshire and East Coast Railway stations
Railway stations in Great Britain opened in 1896
Railway stations in Great Britain closed in 1955